Solidago orientalis  is a rare plant species native to Mexico. The species has been found in the states of Coahuila and Nuevo León in northeastern Mexico.

Solidago orientalis is a perennial herb up to 60 cm (2 fee4t) tall. The leaves are thick, elliptical, up to 7.5 cm (3 inches) long. One plant can produce many small yellow flower heads in a compact branching array at the top of the plant.

References

External links
Photo of herbarium specimen collected in Coahuila in 1981

orientalis
Plants described in 1989
Flora of Northeastern Mexico